Edward Joseph Fletcher (25 February 1911 – 13 February 1983) was a British Labour Party politician.

Early life
Fletcher was educated at Fircroft College, Birmingham, and was a trade union official. He served as a councillor on Newcastle City Council from 1952, and chaired the North-Eastern Association for the Arts.

Parliamentary career
Fletcher unsuccessfully contested Middlesbrough West for the Labour Party at the 1959 general election. At the 1964 general election he was elected as Member of Parliament (MP) for Darlington, and held the seat until his death in 1983, aged 71. He was a member of the Tribune Group and was regarded as being broadly on the left of the Labour Party.

Fletcher's Labour successor after the resulting by-election was Ossie O'Brien, who was MP for just a matter of weeks before he lost to the Conservative Michael Fallon at the 1983 general election.

Legacy
Ted Fletcher Court remains in the Haughton area of Darlington, as a memorial to Fletcher.

References 
Times Guide to the House of Commons, 1966, 1979 & 1983

External links 
 

1911 births
1983 deaths
Alumni of Fircroft College
Association of Professional, Executive, Clerical and Computer Staff-sponsored MPs
Labour Party (UK) MPs for English constituencies
Councillors in Tyne and Wear
UK MPs 1964–1966
UK MPs 1966–1970
UK MPs 1970–1974
UK MPs 1974
UK MPs 1974–1979
UK MPs 1979–1983